Qingyunshan Subdistrict is a Subdistrict in Yuanjiang, Yiyang, Hunan Province, People's Republic of China.

Administrative division
The subdistrict is divided into one village and six communities, the following areas: Heping Community, Yihe Community, Qingyunshan Community, Shuyuan Community, Daqiao Community, Xiangbei Community, and Bainihu Village (和平社区、义和社区、庆云山社区、书院社区、大桥社区、湘北社区、白泥湖村).

References

External links

Divisions of Yuanjiang